Veronica Helfensteller (1910–1964) was an American painter and printmaker, who was a member of the Fort Worth Circle, a group of artists in Fort Worth, Texas, active in the 1940 and 1950s.

Life
Veronica Helfensteller was born in 1910 to Armin and Louise Helfensteller. She lived in Fort Worth during her early years. In 1926-27, she studied at the St. Louis School of Fine Arts at Washington University before continuing her studies at the Colorado Springs Fine Arts Center (Colorado Springs, Colorado). She later studied at the International School of Art in Budapest, Hungary.

Helfensteller exhibited her works in a solo show at the Fort Worth School of Fine Arts in 1938. Animals were at the center of many of Helfensteller's works. They were often depicted in fantastical, allegorical settings. Helfensteller was one of six artists from the Fort Worth group whose work was shown in the Weyhe Gallery in New York in 1944. In 1944, she began etching sessions that were attended by other Fort Worth Circle artists.

That same year, she began etching sessions that were attended by other Fort Worth Circle artists. Kelly Fearing, Dickson Reeder, Bror Utter, Lia Cuilty, Bill Bomar, Cynthia Brants and others would meet at Helfensteller's to work on their art. These weekly meetings were an opportunity for the artists to discuss art, listen to music, and borrow Helfensteller's printmaking press.  After the group separated, Helfensteller moved to Santa Fe, New Mexico in 1947, where she opened a candy shop, taught and painted.

Her work was shown in the retrospective exhibition "Beyond Regionalism: The Fort Worth School (1945–1955)" (Albany, Texas, 1986); in the exhibition "The Texas Printmakers, 1940–1965" (Meadows Museum, Dallas, 1990), and the exhibition "Prints of the Fort Worth Circle, 1940–1960", (Archer Milton Huntington Art Gallery, 1992). Her work is held in the collections of the Modern Art Museum of Fort Worth, the Dallas Museum of Art, and the Museum of Fine Arts, Houston.

Later she moved to Tucson, Arizona, where she taught art history and art appreciation at the Valley School for Girls.

She died in Tucson, Arizona in 1964.

Art
Veronica Helfensteller's artwork was influenced by the artists around her. As a member of the Fort Worth School, she was one of the Texas Modernists, whose works were influenced by American Regionalism, European Cubism and Surrealism. Helfensteller was an avid traveler and these travels influenced her work. Hoops and Kites (1948) incorporates a number of hieroglyphic figures, which reference Mayan hieroglyphics she would have seen in Guatemala. This work balances her Latin American travels with those of the Southwest.

Her works had been largely forgotten until gallery owner Dutch Philips discovered some of her letters at an estate sale. Upon discovering her art, Dutch Phillips organized the first exhibition of sale of her work in over 40 years.

References

Bibliography

1910 births
1964 deaths
Sam Fox School of Design & Visual Arts alumni
American women painters
20th-century American painters
American women printmakers
Painters from Texas
20th-century American women artists
20th-century American printmakers
American etchers
People from Fort Worth, Texas
Women etchers